58 Aquarii, abbreviated 58 Aqr, is a star in the constellation of Aquarius. 58 Aquarii is its Flamsteed designation. It is a sixth magnitude star with an apparent visual magnitude of 6.39, which means it is a challenge to view with the naked eye.

The primary component has a stellar classification of A9/F0 V, matching a main sequence star with a spectrum showing mixed traits of an A/F-type. (Cowley and Fraquelli [1974] has previously assigned it a giant star class of A8 III.) It is a chemically peculiar Am star, showing metallic lines with no magnetic field. The star has 1.7 times the mass of the Sun and 2.1 times the Sun's radius. It is radiating 12 times the Sun's luminosity from its photosphere at an effective temperature of 7,477 K.

References

A-type main-sequence stars
F-type main-sequence stars
A-type giants
Am stars
Binary stars
Aquarius (constellation)
Durchmusterung objects
Aquarii, 058
213464
111200
8583